Christine Charlotte of Solms-Braunfels (10 November 1690 in Greifenstein – 16 October 1771 in Homburg) was a Countess of Solms-Braunfels by birth and by marriage Landgravine of Hesse-Homburg.

Life 
Christine Charlotte was a daughter of Count William Maurice of Solms-Braunfels (1651-1720) from his marriage to Magdalena Sophie (1660-1720), the daughter of Landgrave William Christoph of Hesse-Homburg.

She married on 3 October 1722 in Braunfels to Landgrave Casimir William of Hesse-Homburg (1690-1726).   They resided in Hötensleben.  The princess took care of the education of her children; for this purpose she appointed the theologician  as court tutor.  In 1727, he published his , describing the education of her son.

Casimir William died at the age of 36, shortly after the birth of their third child.  In 1727, the Reichskammergericht in Wetzlar confirmed the appointment of Christine Charlotte as regent for her underage son.

Her brother Frederick William was raised to Imperial Prince in 1742.  In 1746, her regency ended and her son became the ruling Landgrave of Hesse-Homburg.

Issue 
 Frederick IV Charles (1724–1751), ruling Landgrave of Hesse-Homburg
 married in 1746 Princess Ulrike Louise of Solms-Braunfels (1731-1792)
 Eugene (1725-1725)
 Ulrike Sophie (1726–1792)

References 
 Mark Pockrandt: Biblische Aufklärung, p. 28, Online
 Philipp Dieffenbach: Geschichte von Hessen mit besonderer Berücksichtigung des Grohßerzogthums, p. 232 ff, Online

House of Solms
Landgravines of Hesse-Darmstadt
1690 births
1771 deaths
18th-century German people
18th-century women rulers